Nostrum may refer to:

Nostrum remedium, a Latin term for trademarked patent medicine.
Air Nostrum, a regional airline based in Spain.
Exultavit cor nostrum, a 13th Century papal bull.
Mare Nostrum, a Latin nickname for the Mediterranean sea.
Pascha Nostrum, an Easter hymn.
Nostrum Oil & Gas, an oil and gas exploration and production company.